2K is an American video game publisher based in Novato, California. 2K was founded under Take-Two Interactive in January 2005 through the 2K Games and 2K Sports labels, following Take-Two Interactive's acquisition of Visual Concepts that same month. Originally based in New York City, it moved to Novato in 2007. A third label, 2K Play, was added in September 2007. 2K is governed by David Ismailer as president and Phil Dixon as COO. A motion capture studio for 2K is based in Petaluma, California.

History 

On January 24, 2005, Take-Two Interactive announced that it had acquired Visual Concepts, including its Kush Games subsidiary and the intellectual property of the 2K sports-game series, from Sega for  million. The following day Take-Two Interactive established the 2K publishing label, consisting of the sub-labels 2K Games and 2K Sports, with the latter focusing on sports games. Several of Take-Two Interactive's development studios—Visual Concepts, Kush Games, Indie Built, Venom Games, PopTop Software, and Frog City Software—became studios of 2K, and Take-Two Licensing was merged into the new label.

On January 21, 2006, a fire heavily damaged the administration and marketing portions of 2K's offices. In June 2007 2K announced that they had closed their offices in New York City and would move to a new location on the West Coast, namely Novato, California.

On September 10, 2007, Take-Two Interactive announced that they had struck a partnership with Nickelodeon on publishing games based on their licenses. Alongside this announcement, Take-Two Interactive introduced a third 2K label, 2K Play, to focus on casual games. Through this opening, 2K absorbed all assets of Take-Two Interactive's budget-range publisher Global Star Software, including the game Carnival Games, the studio Cat Daddy Games, and games based on Deal or No Deal.

In 2013, 2K obtained the rights to publish video games based on the professional wrestling company, WWE.

On May 4, 2017, 2K's co-founder and until-then president, Christoph Hartmann, announced that he had stepped down from his position. Hartmann had worked for Take-Two Interactive for roughly 20 years, but did not state a reason for his departure. He later joined Amazon Game Studios in August 2018. He was succeeded by previous chief operating officer (COO) David Ismailer later in May 2017. The role of COO was filled by Phil Dixon, formerly of Betfair, in November 2017, and Melissa Bell was hired as senior vice president and head of global marketing in April 2018.

On September 25, 2018, 2K announced 2K Foundations, a program that would "support underserved communities across the nation by refurbishing basketball courts in neighborhoods that need them the most". Microsoft will also partner with 2K to establish Xbox One S gaming-stations at these courts. 2K Foundations planned to refurbish 12 basketball courts in several cities across the United States (including Cincinnati, Baltimore, Los Angeles, Chicago, and Cleveland) within its first year.

2K acquired HB Studios in March 2021, who previously developed The Golf Club 2019 featuring PGA Tour and PGA Tour 2K21 under the 2K Sports' publishing label. The acquisition includes the rights to HB's Golf Club series, which has since relaunched as the PGA Tour 2K series, and is now officially licensed by the PGA Tour itself. Additionally, 2K announced they had secured a contract with Tiger Woods, who had previously been a key figure for Electronic Arts' own PGA Tour series, as an executive director and consultant for future 2K PGA Tour games as well as his likeness for the games.

Also in March 2021, 2K acquired the games division of HookBang based in Austin, Texas, which had supported work on the NBA 2K series in the past. The division was relocated to a new Austin location and rebranded as Visual Concepts Austin to continue support for that series.

In September 2022, 2K's support team was hacked. In October 2022, 2K confirmed their user data was stolen and placed on sale.

Studios 
 2K Madrid in Madrid, Spain; founded in June 2021.
 2K Chengdu in Chengdu, China; founded in June 2011.
 2K Vegas in Las Vegas, Nevada, U.S.; founded in 2006 as 2K West, rebranded in 2013.
 31st Union in San Mateo, California, U.S. and Valencia, Spain; founded in 2019 as 2K Silicon Valley, rebranded in 2020.
Cat Daddy Games in Kirkland, Washington, U.S.; founded in 1996, acquired in 2003.
Cloud Chamber in Novato, California, U.S. and Montreal, Canada; founded in 2019.
 Firaxis Games in Hunt Valley, Maryland, U.S.; founded in 1996, acquired in 2005.
 Hangar 13 in Novato, California, U.S., Brno and Prague, Czech Republic, and Brighton, England; founded in 2014.
 HB Studios in Lunenberg, Nova Scotia, Canada; founded in 2000, acquired in 2021.
 Visual Concepts in Novato, California, U.S.; founded in 1988, acquired in 2005.

Defunct 
 2K Australia in Canberra, Australia; founded in 2000, acquired in 2006, closed in 2015.
 2K China in Shanghai, China; founded in May 2006, closed in November 2015.
 2K Czech in Brno, Czech Republic; founded in 1997, acquired in 2008, merged into Hangar 13 in 2017.
 2K Hangzhou in Hangzhou, China; founded in 2007, closed in November 2016.
 2K Los Angeles in Camarillo, California, U.S.; founded as Kush Games in 1998, acquired in 2005, closed in 2008.
 2K Marin in Novato, California, U.S.; founded in 2007, closed in 2013.
 Frog City Software in San Francisco, U.S.; founded in 1994, acquired in 2003, closed in 2006.
 Indie Built in Salt Lake City, U.S.; founded as Access Software in 1982, acquired and renamed in 2004, closed in 2006.
 Irrational Games in Westwood, Massachusetts, U.S.; founded in 1997, acquired in 2006, closed in 2017 and succeeded by Ghost Story Games.
 PAM Development in Paris, France; founded in 1995, acquired in 2005, closed in 2008.
 PopTop Software in Fenton, Missouri, U.S.; founded in 1993, acquired in 2000, merged into Firaxis Games in 2006.
 Venom Games in Newcastle upon Tyne, England; founded in 2003, acquired in 2004, closed in 2008.

Games published

Franchises and series 
 BioShock (since 2007)
 Borderlands (since 2009)
 Civilization (since 2005)
 Mafia (since 2010)
 X-COM (since 2012)

2K Sports

Current
 NBA 2K (since 2005)
 PGA Tour 2K (since 2018)
 WWE 2K (since 2013)

Former
 College Hoops 2K (2005–2007)
 College Hoops 2K6
 College Hoops 2K7
 College Hoops 2K8
 MLB 2K (2005–2013)
 NHL 2K (2005–2014)
 Top Spin (2005–2011)

References

External links 
 

 
2005 establishments in New York (state)
American companies established in 2005
Companies based in Marin County, California
Novato, California
Software companies based in the San Francisco Bay Area
Take-Two Interactive divisions and subsidiaries
Video game companies based in California
Video game companies established in 2005
Video game publishers
Video game publishing brands